Battery G, 1st Illinois Light Artillery Regiment, was an artillery battery that served in the Union Army during the American Civil War.  The battery was also known as O'Leary's Battery and Rombauer's Battery.

Service
Battery G was organized in Cairo, Illinois and mustered in February 28, 1862, for a three-year enlistment under the command of Captain Arthur O'Leary.

The battery was attached to Flotilla Brigade, Army of the Mississippi, to April 1862. Artillery Division, Army of the Mississippi, to July 1862. Artillery, District of Corinth, Mississippi, to November 1862. Artillery, District of Corinth, XIII Corps, Department of the Tennessee, to December 1862. Artillery, District of Corinth, XVII Corps, to January 1863. Artillery, District of Corinth, XVI Corps, to March 1863. Artillery, 2nd Division, XVI Corps, to November 1863. Post of Corinth, Mississippi, XVI Corps, to January 1864. Fort Pickering, District of Memphis, XVI Corps, to June 1864. 1st Brigade, Post and Defenses of Memphis, District of West Tennessee, to December 1864. Artillery Reserve, District of West Tennessee, to July 1865.

Battery G mustered out of service July 24, 1865.

Detailed service
Moved to Columbus, Kentucky, March 18, then to Island No. 10, Mississippi River. Operations against Island No. 10, Mississippi River, and garrison at New Madrid, Missouri, March 20-April 11, 1862. Union City, Tennessee, March 31. Action and capture at Tipton April 8. Moved to Columbus, Kentucky, April 11. Expedition to Fort Pillow, Tennessee, April 13–17. Moved to Hamburg Landing, Tennessee, April 17–22. Advance on and siege of Corinth, Mississippi, April 29-May 30. Occupation of Corinth and pursuit to Booneville May 30-June 12. Duty at Corinth, Mississippi, until January 1864. Battle of Corinth October 3–4, 1862. Moved to Memphis, Tennessee, January 1864, and duty there in the defenses of that city and in the District of West Tennessee until July 1865.

Casualties
The battery lost a total of 12 men during service; 1 enlisted men killed, 11 enlisted men died of disease.

Commanders
 Captain Arthur O'Leary - discharged August 21, 1862
 Captain Ralph G. Rombauer - promoted to major
 Captain William N. Taylor - promoted from 1st lieutenant April 1, 1865, but never mustered

See also

 List of Illinois Civil War units
 Illinois in the Civil War

References
 Dyer, Frederick H. A Compendium of the War of the Rebellion (Des Moines, IA: Dyer Pub. Co.), 1908.
Attribution

External links
 Roster of Battery F, 1st Illinois Light Artillery transcribed by Jim Willison

Military units and formations established in 1862
Military units and formations disestablished in 1865
Units and formations of the Union Army from Illinois
1862 establishments in Illinois
Artillery units and formations of the American Civil War